Porridge is a dish made by boiling ground, crushed, or chopped starchy plants—typically grain—in water, milk or both.

Porridge may also refer to:

 Porridge (1974 TV series), a British situational comedy set in a prison
 Porridge (film), a 1979 film derived from the 1974 TV series
 Porridge (2016 TV series), a sequel series to the original situational comedy series

See also
 Pease porridge or pease pudding, a foodstuff made from split peas
 "Pease Porridge Hot", a nursery rhyme
 "Sweet Porridge", a German fairy tale recorded by the Brothers Grimm
 List of porridges